Schörghuber Unternehmensgruppe (SUG) is a company owned by Schörghuber Stiftung & Co. Holding KG (SHKG). It operates nationally and internationally in the fields of beverages, hotels, salmon farming and processing, construction and real estate.

History
In 1954 Josef Schörghuber founded a property developer and real estate business in Munich, Bayerische Hausbau GmbH & Co. KG. At the end of the 1950s, he entered the commercial aviation business, the foundation of the former aircraft leasing division (until 2011). In 1969, the company entered the hotel business with the operation of the Arabella Hochhaus in Munich. In 1978, Schörghuber took over the prefabricated house manufacturer Hanse Haus.

At the end of the 1970s, Unternehmensgruppe took over Heilmann & Littmann Bau-AG. In 1980, the company decided to merge with KG Sager & Woerner to form Heilit+Woerner Bau-AG, but sold it to Walter Bau AG in 1988 for a symbolic price of one mark.

At the end of the 1970s, Schörghuber entered the beer business by purchasing the Hacker-Pschorr and Paulaner breweries. After Josef Schörghuber's death in 1995, his son Stefan Schörghuber, who had been working in the hotel and mountain railways sector in the company since 1984, took over the company. Since the death of Stefan Schörghuber on 25 November 2008, his widow Alexandra Schörghuber has been running the company.

References

Companies based in Munich
1954 establishments in West Germany
German companies established in 1954
Conglomerate companies of Germany
Real estate companies of Germany